William George Barker,  (3 November 1894 – 12 March 1930) was a Canadian First World War fighter ace and Victoria Cross recipient. He is the most decorated serviceman in the history of Canada.

Early life
Born on a family farm in Dauphin, Manitoba, "Will" Barker grew up on the frontier of the Great Plains, riding horses, shooting, and working as a youngster on his father's farm and sawmill. He was an exceptional shot, using a lever-action Winchester that he had modified with his own iron sight. He was particularly adept at shooting on the move, even while on horseback. One biographer has suggested that he could have been a trick shooter in a circus. He was physically poised, emotionally intense, with wide-ranging interests, and had an innate flair for the dramatic act. He was a very good student in school, but had frequent absences due to farm and sawmill life; he was the hunter providing food for the workers in the sawmill while still a young teenager, and missed classes because of this obligation.
Barker was a Boy Scout at Russell, Manitoba, and a member of the 32nd Light Horse, a Non-Permanent Active Militia unit based at Roblin, Manitoba. He was in Grade 11 at Dauphin Collegiate Institute in the fall of 1914, just before his enlistment.

First World War
In December 1914, soon after the outbreak of the First World War and the subsequent call to arms in the Dominion of Canada, Barker enlisted as No 106074 Trooper William G. Barker in the 1st Canadian Mounted Rifles. The regiment went to England in June 1915 and then to France on 22 September of that year. Barker was a Colt machine gunner with the regiment's machine gun section until late February or early March 1916, when he transferred as a probationary observer to 9 Squadron of the Royal Flying Corps, flying in Royal Aircraft Factory B.E.2 aircraft.

Western Front 1916–17
He was commissioned as a second lieutenant in April and was given five days' leave in London to acquire an officer's uniform and equipment. On his return, he was assigned to 4 Squadron and on 7 July transferred to 15 Squadron, still flying in the B.E.2. On 21 July Barker claimed a Roland scout "driven down" with his observer's gun, and in August claimed a second Roland, this time in flames. He was Mentioned in Despatches around this time. He officially qualified as an Observer on 27 August and on 15 September he worked for the first time with Canadian troops, including his old regiment. On 15 November, Barker and his pilot, flying very low over the Ancre River, spotted a large concentration of German troops massing for a counter-attack on Beaumont Hamel. The crew sent an emergency Zone Call which brought to bear all available artillery fire in the area onto the specified target. The force of some 4,000 German infantry was effectively broken up. He was awarded the Military Cross (MC) for this action in the concluding stages of the Battle of the Somme.
 
In January 1917, after spending Christmas on leave in London, he commenced pilot training at Netheravon, flying solo after 55 minutes of dual instruction. On 24 February 1917, he returned to serve a second tour on Corps Co-operation machines as a pilot flying B.E.2s and R.E.8s with 15 Squadron. On 25 March, Barker claimed another scout "driven down". On 25 April 1917 during the Arras Offensive, Barker, flying an R.E.8 with observer Lt. Goodfellow, spotted over 1,000 German troops sheltering in support trenches. The duo directed artillery fire into the positions, thereby avoiding a counter-attack.

After being awarded a bar to his MC in July, Barker was wounded in the head by anti-aircraft fire in August 1917. After a short spell in the UK as an instructor, Barker's continual requests for front-line service resulted in him being transferred to become a scout pilot, being offered a post with either 56 Squadron or 28 Squadron. He chose command of C Flight in the newly formed 28 Squadron, flying the Sopwith Camel that he preferred over the S.E.5s of 56 Squadron. Although Barker was reportedly not a highly skilled pilot – suffering several flying accidents during his career – he compensated for this deficiency with aggressiveness in action and highly accurate marksmanship.

The unit moved to France on 8 October 1917. Barker downed an Albatros D.V on his first patrol, though he did not claim it as the patrol was unofficial. He claimed an Albatros of Jasta 2 (Lt. Lange, killed) on 20 October, and two more, of Jasta 18, on 27 October (Lt. Schober killed, Offstv. Klein, force landed).

Italian Front 1917–18
On 7 November 1917, 28 Squadron was transferred to Italy with Barker temporarily in command; most of the unit, including aircraft, traveled by train to Milan. On 29 November he downed an Austrian Albatros D.III flown by Lt. Haertl of Jasta 1 near Pieve di Soligo. A Jasta 39 pilot was shot down and killed and a balloon of BK 10 destroyed on 3 December.

One of his most successful, and also most controversial raids – fictionalized by Ernest Hemingway in the short story "The Snows of Kilimanjaro" – was on 25 December 1917. Catching the Germans off guard, he and Lt. Harold B. Hudson, his wingman, shot up the airfield of Fliegerabteilung (A) 204, setting fire to one hangar and damaging four German aircraft before dropping a placard wishing their opponents a "Happy Christmas."
 
Lt. Lang of Jasta 1 was killed by Barker on 1 January 1918, and two balloons, two Albatros fighters (one flown by Feldwebel Karl Semmelrock of Flik 51J) and a pair of two-seaters fell to Barker during February. Awarded the Distinguished Service Order (DSO) in March, he also claimed three more Albatroses and an observation balloon.

Owing to his tendency to ignore orders by flying many unofficial patrols, Barker was passed over when the post of Commanding Officer of 28 Squadron became vacant. Dissatisfied, he applied for a posting and joined 66 Squadron in April 1918, where he claimed a further 16 kills by mid-July.

On 17 April, he shot down Oblt. Gassner-Norden of Flik 41J, flying an Albatros D.III (OEF), over Vittorio. He then became Squadron Commander of 139 Squadron, flying the Bristol Fighter. Barker however took his Sopwith Camel with him and continued to fly fighter operations. He carried out an unusual sortie on the night of 9 August when he flew a Savoia-Pomilio SP.4 bomber to land a spy behind enemy lines.
  
By this time, his personal Sopwith Camel (serial no. B6313) had become the most successful fighter aircraft in the history of the RAF, Barker having used it to shoot down 46 aircraft and balloons from September 1917 to September 1918, for a total of 404 operational flying hours. It was dismantled in October 1918, Barker keeping the clock as a memento, although he was asked to return it the following day. During this time, Barker trialed a series of modifications to B6313, to improve its combat performance. The Clerget rotary engine's cooling efficiency was poorer in the hotter Italian climate, so several supplementary cooling slots were cut into the cowling. The poor upward visibility of the Camel resulted in Barker cutting away progressively larger portions of the center-section fabric. He also had a rifle-type, notch and bead gun-sight arrangement replace the standard gun sight fitting.

Having flown more than 900 combat hours in two and a half years, Barker was transferred back to the UK in September 1918 to command the fighter training school at Hounslow Heath Aerodrome. Barker ended his Italian service with some 33 aircraft claimed destroyed and nine observation balloons downed, individually or with other pilots.

Victoria Cross
In London at RAF HQ, he persuaded his superiors he needed to get up to date on the latest combat techniques in France and he was granted a 10-day roving commission in France. He selected the Sopwith Snipe as his personal machine and attached himself to No. 201 Squadron RAF, whose commander, Major Cyril Leman, was a friend from his days as a Corps Co-operation airman. He was awarded the Victoria Cross for his actions on Sunday, 27 October 1918, day 10 of his roving commission.

While returning his Snipe to an aircraft depot, he crossed enemy lines at 21,000 feet above the Forêt de Mormal. He attacked an enemy Rumpler two-seater which broke up, its crew escaping by parachute (the aircraft was of FAA 227, Observer Lt. Oskar Wattenburg killed). By his own admission, he was careless and was bounced by a formation of Fokker D.VIIs of Jagdgruppe 12, consisting of Jasta 24 and Jasta 44, in a descending battle against 15 or more enemy machines. The dogfight took place immediately above the lines of the Canadian Corps.  Severely wounded and bleeding profusely, Barker force-landed inside Allied lines, his life being saved by the men of an RAF Kite Balloon Section who transported him to a field dressing station. The fuselage of his Snipe aircraft was recovered from the battlefield and is preserved at the Canadian War Museum, Ottawa, Ontario.

At a hospital in Rouen, France, Barker clung to life until mid-January 1919, and then was transported back to England. He was not fit enough to walk the necessary few paces for the VC investiture at Buckingham Palace until 1 March 1919.

Barker is officially credited with one captured, two (and seven shared) balloons destroyed, 33 (and two shared) aircraft destroyed, and five aircraft "out of control", the highest "destroyed" ratio for any RAF, RFC, or RNAS pilot during the conflict. The Overseas Military Forces of Canada recognized Barker as "holding the record for fighting decorations" awarded in the First World War.

Most decorated hero
Barker returned to Canada in May 1919 as the most decorated Canadian of the war, with the Victoria Cross, the Distinguished Service Order and Bar, the Military Cross and two Bars, two Italian Silver Medals for Military Valour, and the French Croix de guerre. He was also mentioned in despatches three times.  The Canadian Daily Record, a publication of the Overseas Military Forces of Canada, wrote in December 1918 that William Barker of Dauphin, Manitoba was the Canadian holding the record for "most fighting decorations" in the war. No other Canadian soldier, sailor or airman has surpassed this record, and the Canadian War Museum exhibit, located in Ottawa, Ontario, states: "Lieutenant Colonel William G. Barker, one of the legendary aces of the war, remains the most decorated Canadian in military service."  A plaque on his tomb in the mausoleum of Toronto's Mount Pleasant Cemetery, officially unveiled on 22 September 2011, describes him as "The most decorated war hero in the history of Canada, the British Empire, and the Commonwealth of Nations." Only two other servicemen in the history of the Commonwealth or Empire have received as many British medals for gallantry. These were Mick Mannock and James McCudden and, like Barker, both were "scout pilots" in the First World War. Barker, Mannock, and McCudden each received six British medals, including the Victoria Cross. McCudden was also awarded a French Croix de Guerre. But with his three foreign medals and three Mentions in Despatches, Barker received a total of 12 awards for valor.

Post-war
Barker formed a business partnership, Bishop-Barker Aeroplanes Limited, with fellow Victoria Cross recipient and Canadian ace Billy Bishop which lasted for about three years. In 1922 he rejoined the fledgling Canadian Air Force in the rank of Wing Commander, serving as the Station Commander of Camp Borden from 1922 to 1924.

Barker was appointed acting director of the RCAF in early 1924 and he graduated from RAF Staff College, Andover, in 1926.  While waiting to start RAF Staff College Course No 4, Barker spent two weeks in Iraq with the RAF to learn more about the uses of airpower. He formally reported on his findings to the Minister of National Defence, and informally to Brigadier General Billy Mitchell, of the US Air Service. One of his achievements in the RCAF was the introduction of parachutes.  After leaving the RCAF he became the first president of the Toronto Maple Leafs hockey club and involved in tobacco growing farms in southwestern Ontario.

Barker continued to suffer from the physical effects of his 1918 gunshot wounds: his legs were permanently damaged and he suffered severely limited movement in his left arm. He also struggled with alcoholism in the last few years of his life.  He died in 1930 when he lost control of his Fairchild KR-21 biplane trainer during a demonstration flight for the RCAF, at Air Station Rockcliffe, near Ottawa, Ontario.  Barker, aged 35, was at the time the President and general manager of Fairchild Aircraft in Montreal.

Legacy

His funeral, the largest national state event in Toronto's history, was attended by an honour guard of 2,000 soldiers.  The cortege stretched for more than a mile and a half, and included the Chief of the General Staff and his senior officers, the Lieutenant Governor of Ontario, the Mayor of Toronto, three federal government cabinet ministers, and six other Victoria Cross recipients. An honour guard was also provided by the United States Army.  Some 50,000 spectators lined the streets of Toronto en route to Mount Pleasant Cemetery, where Barker was interred in his wife's family crypt in the Mausoleum.

On 6 June 1931, an airport in Toronto was renamed Barker Field in his memory.

In his hometown, Dauphin, Manitoba, an elementary school, and the Barker Airport (dedicated in 1998) is named in his honour.  The Dauphin squadron of the Royal Canadian Air Cadets is named for Barker. An elementary school at CFB (Canadian Forces Base) Borden in Ontario was also named after Barker before its closure in the mid-1990s. In 2012, Southport Aerospace Centre named their new flight student accommodation building after him. During the week of 8 January 1999, the Canadian Federal Government designated Barker a person of national historic significance. The Discovery Channel's Flightpath series, a television documentary, included an episode entitled "First of the Few", a biography of William Barker, broadcast in Canada on 27 April 1999. In 2003 History TV broadcast "The Hero's Hero – The Forgotten Life of William Barker."

Barker's only daughter, Jean Antoinette Mackenzie (née Barker), died in July 2007. On 22 September 2011, a memorial at Mount Pleasant Cemetery in Toronto was unveiled to mark William Barker as the "most decorated war hero in the history of Canada, the British Empire, and the Commonwealth of Nations."

In October 2021, it was announced that the UK's seventh Poseidon MRA1 maritime patrol aircraft will be known as William Barker VC.

References

Notes

Bibliography

 Drew, George A. Canada's Fighting Airmen. Toronto: MacLean Publishing Co. Ltd., 1930.
 Enman, Charles. "Billy Barker: 'The Deadliest Air Fighter that ever Lived'." Ottawa Citizen, 12 November 2005, p. E6.
 Pigott, Peter. Taming the Skies: A Celebration of Canadian Flight. Toronto: Dundurn Press, 2003. .
 Ralph, Wayne. Barker VC: The Classic Story of a Legendary First World War Hero.  London: Grub Street, 1999. .
 Ralph, Wayne. William Barker VC: The Life, Death & Legend of Canada's Most Decorated War Hero. Mississauga, Ontario: John Wiley & Sons Canada Ltd., 2007. .
 Shores, Christopher, Norman Franks and Russell Guest. Above the Trenches: A Complete Record of the Fighter Aces and Units of the British Empire Air Forces, 1915–20. London: Grub Street, 1991. .
Ralph, Wayne. BARKER, WILLIAM GEORGE

External links 

 William George Barker's digitized service file
 William George "Will" Barker
 Biography at the Dictionary of Canadian Biography Online
 
 Burial location of William Barker: "Toronto"
 Location of William Barker's Victoria Cross, "Canadian War Museum" 
 Legion Magazine Article on William George Barker
 Major William George Barker VC, DSO & bar, MC & 2 bars, Croix de Guerre, Medaglia al Valore Militare d'Argento & bar RFC, RAF 
 Barker's Medals At The Canadian War Museum
 Barker at The Canadian Encyclopedia
 
 William Barker VC at www.mysteriesofcanada.com
 Statue
 Death notice for Jean Barker Mackenzie

|-

|-

|-

1894 births
1930 deaths
Canadian military personnel from Manitoba
Aviation history of Canada
People from Dauphin, Manitoba
Canadian Expeditionary Force soldiers
Royal Air Force officers
Royal Flying Corps officers
Royal Canadian Air Force officers
Canadian World War I flying aces
Canadian World War I recipients of the Victoria Cross
Royal Air Force recipients of the Victoria Cross
Recipients of the Silver Medal of Military Valor
Aviators killed in aviation accidents or incidents in Canada
Recipients of the Croix de Guerre 1914–1918 (France)
Persons of National Historic Significance (Canada)
Canadian recipients of the Military Cross
Canadian Companions of the Distinguished Service Order
Accidental deaths in Ontario
Canadian military personnel of World War I
Canadian aviation record holders
Burials at Mount Pleasant Cemetery, Toronto
Victims of aviation accidents or incidents in 1930